Saint John's Cathedral in Denver, Colorado, United States is the seat of the bishop and the cathedral of the Episcopal Diocese of Colorado and part of the Episcopal Church in the United States.  Construction began in 1909, the first service held in the cathedral in 1911, and it was added to the National Register of Historic Places in 1975. In 2020, it reported 1,949 members, 474 average attendance, and $1,498,586 in plate and pledge financial assistance.

History
Father John H. Kehler traveled from Virginia to the group of mining camps known as Denver City in January 1860 and delivered the first public services of the Episcopal Church in what would become Colorado Territory. He eventually established the parish of St. John's in the Wilderness, so named because the nearest Episcopal parish was seven hundred miles away in Kansas.

The first cathedral was at 20th and Welton and held its first services in 1881. Dean H. Martyn Hart was the first dean of the cathedral and he worked with other Denver clergy in 1887 to create the Denver Charity Organization, the first community charity solicitation fund in the United States - later renamed the United Way.

A fire at the church in 1903 led to the construction of the current cathedral block at 14th and Washington.  In 1908 a blind contest was held and the design of New York architectural firm of Tracy and Swartwout was selected. Work began on Saint John's Cathedral in 1908. The original design made use of flying buttresses to support the weight of the roof. This design allows for thinner walls and more glass area. The buttressed design was considered too expensive to build, so a redesign was requested which limited the cathedral to the nave and provided a temporary brick chancel. The foundation was then completed from this design. Bids for this revised design were still too high, so another redesign was requested, this third design excluded the buttresses and consequently had thicker heavier walls. The result of the installed foundation being too small to support the increased weight of the newest design's thicker and heavier walls resulted in  the cathedral sinking during construction. Some walls and the center arch between the towers had to be disassembled and foundation corrected before building could resume. A lawsuit brought against Tracy and Swartwout was dismissed, as the building committee was found to be at fault. The two transepts, choir and great tower were never built. Only the nave was completed of limestone with a "temporary" brick chancel. The height of the ceiling in the Nave is 65 feet. It is 185 feet long and 52 feet wide. Dean Hart lead the construction committee and hosted its first services in 1911.

The stained glass was created by Charles Connick's studio.

United States Supreme Court Associate Justice Byron White was buried at St. John's Cathedral in 2002.

See also

 National Register of Historic Places listings in downtown Denver
 List of the Episcopal cathedrals of the United States
 List of cathedrals in the United States
 Pipe Organ Database

References

External links

 
  Episcopal Diocese of Colorado

20th-century Episcopal church buildings
Churches completed in 1911
Churches in Denver
Churches on the National Register of Historic Places in Colorado
Episcopal church buildings in Colorado
Gothic Revival church buildings in Colorado
National Register of Historic Places in Denver
Saint John's Cathedral Denver